Looneyville may refer to:

Looneyville, New York, a hamlet in Erie County
Looneyville, Texas, an unincorporated community in Nacogdoches County
Looneyville, West Virginia, an unincorporated community in Roane County